The 1989 Columbia Lions football team was an American football team that represented Columbia University during the 1989 NCAA Division I-AA football season. Columbia finished last in the Ivy League. In their first season under head coach Ray Tellier, the Lions compiled a 1–9 record and were outscored 263 to 118. Bart Barnett was the team captain.  The Lions' 1–6 conference record was the worst in the Ivy League standings. Columbia was outscored 170 to 104 by Ivy opponents. Columbia played its homes games at Lawrence A. Wien Stadium in Upper Manhattan, in New York City.

Schedule

References

Columbia
Columbia Lions football seasons
Columbia Lions football